The Montreal Beavers were a professional American football team based in Montreal, Quebec, Canada. The franchise began as the Indianapolis Warriors of the United Football League in 1961, where they played for four seasons. During that time the Warriors made the UFL playoffs three times, and advanced to the league championship in 1964. The team moved to Fort Wayne in January 1965, and became a charter member of the Continental Football League (CFL) when it was formed the next month.

Unable to find financial success in Indiana, team owner Al Savill sold the Warriors to a group from Montreal led by construction magnate, and former Montreal Alouette, Johnny Newman in March 1966. Led by former South Carolina head coach Marvin Bass, the Beavers finished with a 7-7 record in 1966 and a 4-8 mark in 1967. The team denied rumours of a sale in early 1968, but nevertheless folded before the season began.

The Indianapolis Capitols were considered "an outgrowth" of the team when the expansion franchise was established in 1969 for play in the CFL.

Season-by-season

References

Continental Football League teams
American football teams in Canada
American football teams in Indiana
Sports in Fort Wayne, Indiana
Sports teams in Indianapolis
Sports teams in Montreal
American football teams established in 1961
American football teams disestablished in 1968
1961 establishments in Indiana
1968 disestablishments in Quebec

Defunct Canadian football teams